The Books of Magic was a four-issue mini-series published by DC Comics written by Neil Gaiman, later revived as an ongoing series written by John Ney Rieber (issues 1–50) and Peter Gross (issues 51–75). The comics told the story of Timothy Hunter, a teenager who was destined to grow up into his world's greatest magician. It finished after 75 issues, before being relaunched as Hunter: The Age of Magic by writer Dylan Horrocks.

Family

The Trenchcoat Brigade

Children

The Fair Folk

Myths, legends and other creatures

Imaginary friends
Like many children, Tim had an active imagination as a child and invented a number of imaginary friends to play with. However, because of his power as an Opener, these friends became real and continued to exist long after he had forgotten them. As he became more aware of his power, so too did he become aware of his lost friends.

Adversaries and sort-of friends

The Books of Magic
Books of Magic, The